1,1-Dibromoethane is a clear, slightly brown, flammable chemical compound. It is classified as the organobromine compound, and has the chemical formula CHBr and it is a position isomer of 1,2-dibromoethane. It is commonly seen in industrial chemistry, where it is used as a fuel additive. It is also used as a grain and soil fumigant for insect control.

Synthesis
1,1-Dibromoethane is synthesized through addition of hydrogen bromide onto vinyl bromide with absence of peroxide radical.

Safety
1,1-Dibromoethane is considered as a mild toxic compound, especially with bromines attached as substituents. Bromines on the ethane are strong oxidizing agents. If absorbed through inhalation, 1,1-dibromoethane could potentially cause neuronal effects, tissue damage, and bromism.

References

Bromoalkanes